The 2013 Men's European Volleyball Championship was the 28th edition of the European Volleyball Championship, organised by Europe's governing volleyball body, the CEV. It was held in Denmark and Poland from 20 to 29 September 2013.

The championship was won by Russia with Italy as runners-up and Serbia on the 3rd place.

Qualification

Hosts

Top 5 teams of the 2011 edition directly qualified.

Qualified through the qualification.

Pools composition
The draw was held on 15 October 2012.

Squads

Venues

Pool standing procedure
 Match points
 Number of matches won
 Sets ratio
 Points ratio
 Result of the last match between the tied teams

Match won 3–0 or 3–1: 3 match points for the winner, 0 match points for the loser
Match won 3–2: 2 match points for the winner, 1 match point for the loser

Preliminary round
All times are Central European Summer Time (UTC+02:00).

Pool A

|}

Pool B

|}

Pool C

|}

Pool D

|}

Final round
All times are Central European Summer Time (UTC+02:00).

Playoffs

Quarterfinals

Semifinals

3rd place match

Final

Final standing

Awards

Most Valuable Player
  Dmitriy Muserskiy
Best Scorer
  Aleksandar Atanasijević
Best Spiker
  Luca Vettori
Best Blocker
  Srećko Lisinac
Best Server
  Ivan Zaytsev
Best Setter
  Sergey Grankin
Best Receiver
  Todor Aleksiev
Best Libero
  Aleksey Verbov
Fair Play Award
  Nikola Jovović

External links
Official website
Organizer website

2013
2013 Men's European Volleyball Championship
2013 Men's European Volleyball Championship
Men's European Volleyball Championship
Men's European Volleyball Championship
Men's European Volleyball Championship
September 2013 sports events in Europe